Domina is a British-Italian historical drama television series created and written by Simon Burke for Sky Atlantic (Italy) and Sky Atlantic (UK). Starring Kasia Smutniak as Livia Drusilla, it examines the power struggles of Ancient Rome from a female perspective. The series premiered on 14 May 2021. Domina has been renewed for a second series.

Premise 
The series charts the life and rise of Livia Drusilla, the powerful wife of the Roman emperor Augustus Caesar.

Cast

Main

Recurring

Guests

Episodes

Production 
Written by Simon Burke, the lead director is Australian filmmaker Claire McCarthy. Filming for Domina resumed at the Cinecittà studios in Rome in July 2020 following delays from the initial start in 2019 due to the COVID-19 pandemic. The show's title comes from the female version of 'Dominus', the Ancient Roman title for sovereignty, and from which the word 'dominate' originates. 
As pointed out by Nicola Maccanico (executive vp programming of Sky Italia), Domina is an international production with strong Italian roots. Ancient Rome is brought back to life, bringing together at Cinecittà the great international artistic values and the best Italian talents in the sector: the costumes will be designed by the Academy Award winning Gabriella Pescucci (The Age of Innocence, Once Upon A Time in America, etc.), and production design by the ADG award winner, Luca Tranchino (Prison Break, etc.) 

In February 2022, Epix renewed the show for a second series.

Broadcast 
The series was released in its entirety on 14 May 2021 on Sky Box Sets and NOW in Italy and the UK. It premiered on television the same day on Sky Atlantic (Italy) and Sky Atlantic (UK).

In the United States, the series premiered on 6 June 2021 on Epix.

Reception 
The series has received mostly positive reviews from critics. On Rotten Tomatoes, the series holds an approval rating of 78% based on 9 reviews, with an average score of 6.3/10. Suzi Feay in The Financial Times dubbed the series “Game of Romans”. Historian Tom Holland in The Times agreed that “The echoes of Game of Thrones in the first two episodes are strong, and surely deliberate...the rest of the series approximates more closely to a political thriller”. Holland praised the show “the meat of the show is so enjoyably done that the odd anachronism hardly matters. The 20s BC, sandwiched between the suicides of Antony and Cleopatra and the maturity of Augustus, have never before been the subject of popular drama, but Domina demonstrates to brilliant effect how unjustly neglected they have been... Part of the fun of the series is seeing characters who became significant players in the later decades of Augustus’s life as teenagers”.

References

External links 
 

2021 Italian television series debuts
2021 British television series debuts
Television dramas set in ancient Rome
2020s Italian drama television series
2020s British drama television series
Italian drama television series
British drama television series
Television series by Endemol
Television shows filmed in Italy
Cultural depictions of Livia
Depictions of Augustus on television
Sky Atlantic (Italy) television programmes
Italia 1 original programming